During the 2010–11 Peterborough United F.C. season saw the club play in the Football League One after relegation from Football League Championship after spending just the 2009–10 season in the Championship.

Squad
Updated 1 March 2011.

Transfers

In

Competitions

League One

FA Cup

League Cup

Football League Trophy

References

2010-11
2010–11 Football League One by team